Mauno is a Finnish masculine given name. Notable people with the name include:

Mauno Castrén (1931–2021), Finnish diplomat
Mauno Forsman (1928–2006), Finnish politician (Social Democrat), Member of Parliament 1971–1983
Mauno Hartman (1930–2017), Finnish sculptor
Mauno Järvelä (born 1949), Finnish fiddler, violinist and music pedagogue
Mauno Jokipii (1924–2007), Finnish professor of history at the University of Jyväskylä specializing in World War II
Mauno Jussila (1908–1988), Finnish farmer and politician
Mauno Kling, second governor of the 17th century colony of New Sweden administrated from Fort Christina, now Wilmington, Delaware
Mauno Koivisto GOIH (1923–2017), Finnish politician who served as the ninth President of Finland from 1982 to 1994
Mauno Kurppa (1927–1999), Finnish farmer, business executive and politician
Mauno Kuusisto (1917–2010), popular Finnish vocalist, opera singer (tenor) and actor
Mauno Maisala (1933–2009), Finnish rower
Mauno Mäkelä (1916–1987), Finnish film producer
Mauno Manninen (1915–1969), Finnish poet, painter and theatre director
Mauno Nurmi (1936–2018), professional football and ice hockey player
Mauno Pekkala (1890–1952), Finnish politician and Prime Minister from 1946 to 1948
Mauno Tarkiainen (1904–1971), Finnish long-distance runner
Mauno Uusivirta (born 1948), Finnish former racing cyclist
Mauno Valkeinen (1930–2015), Finnish swimmer

See also
Mano (disambiguation)
Maun (disambiguation)
Maunoury

Finnish masculine given names